Karl Magnus Satre (February 6, 1904 – January 14, 1955) was a Norwegian-born American skier. He was a member of the U.S. Olympic Team in 1936.

Karl Magnus Satre (né Sætre) was born at Trysil in Hedmark, Norway.  He was a brother of Olympic skier Paul Ottar Satre. He emigrated to the United States in 1927 and settled in Salisbury, Connecticut. He competed in cross-country skiing and Nordic combined at the 1936 Winter Olympics in Garmisch-Partenkirchen. He was six times American champion in Nordic combined. .

References

External links

1904 births
1955 deaths
People from Trysil
Norwegian emigrants to the United States
American male Nordic combined skiers
American male cross-country skiers
Olympic Nordic combined skiers of the United States
Olympic cross-country skiers of the United States
Nordic combined skiers at the 1936 Winter Olympics
Cross-country skiers at the 1936 Winter Olympics